Frank Yeury Garcés Ochoa (born January 17, 1990) is a Dominican professional baseball pitcher for the Barrie Baycats of the Intercounty Baseball League (IBL). He has played in Major League Baseball for the San Diego Padres and in Nippon Professional Baseball for the Saitama Seibu Lions.

Professional career

Texas Rangers
Garcés signed with the Texas Rangers organization as an international free agent on May 29, 2009. He was assigned to the Dominican Summer League Rangers and appeared in eight games, posting a 0–2 win–loss record, 4.96 earned run average (ERA), and 12 strikeouts in 16 innings pitched.

San Diego Padres
Garcés was released by the Rangers organization on September 26, 2009, and signed with the San Diego Padres organization on May 12, 2011. Assigned to the Dominican Summer League Padres for the 2011 season, Garcés pitched to a 4–3 record, 2.51 ERA, and 115 strikeouts in 71 innings.

In 2012, Garcés was promoted to the Class-A Fort Wayne TinCaps and made 25 starts for the team. In a career-high 121 innings, he posted a 9–6 record, 2.81 ERA, and 112 strikeouts. Garcés continued to progress through the Padres minor league organization, pitching the entire 2013 season with the Advanced-A Lake Elsinore Storm. He struggled in his 26 starts, going 7–9 with a 5.67 ERA and 126 strikeouts. In the offseason, Garcés played with the Toros del Este of the Dominican Winter League. He was assigned to the Double-A San Antonio Missions in 2014, where he posted a 2–5 record, 1.94 ERA, and 74 strikeouts in 51 relief appearances.

Major Leagues
Garcés was called up to MLB for the first time on August 19, 2014. He was optioned to Double-A on August 23, after making two scoreless appearances for San Diego. Garcés was recalled in September and made 15 relief appearances for the Padres in 2014, with a 2.00 ERA and 10 strikeouts. Garcés returned to the Toros del Este in the offseason. In 2015, he made 40 appearances for the Padres, and posted a 0–1 win–loss record, 5.21 ERA, and 30 strikeouts in 38 innings. He also made 19 appearances for the Triple-A El Paso Chihuahuas in 2015, going 1–0 with a 2.91 ERA and 17 strikeouts.

On December 2, 2015, Garcés was granted free agency. He signed a minor league contract with the Padres on December 6. He spent the entire 2016 season in Triple-A El Paso, pitching to a 6–8 record, 4.41 ERA, and 98 strikeouts in 114 innings.

Saitama Seibu Lions
On November 17, 2016, Garcés signed a minor league contract with the Miami Marlins organization.

On December 14, 2016, Garcés signed a one-year, 60 million yen contract with the Saitama Seibu Lions of Nippon Professional Baseball. Garcés recorded a 2-2 record and 6.39 ERA in 18 appearances for the Lions in 2017. On October 25, 2017, he became a free agent.

Barrie Baycats
On June 14, 2018, Garcés made his debut with the Barrie Baycats of the Intercounty Baseball League.

Algodoneros de Unión Laguna
On April 3, 2019, Garcés signed with the Algodoneros de Unión Laguna of the Mexican League. He was released on July 15, 2019.

Piratas de Campeche
On July 17, 2019, Garcés signed with the Piratas de Campeche of the Mexican League. He was released by the Piratas on February 11, 2020.

Barrie Baycats (second stint)
On March 1, 2021, Garcés signed with the Barrie Baycats of the Intercounty Baseball League, joining the team for the 2021 season.

Pericos de Puebla
On July 8, 2021, Garcés signed with the Pericos de Puebla of the Mexican League. He was released by the team on October 20, 2021.

Barrie Baycats (third stint)
On December 23, 2021, Garcés signed with the Barrie Baycats of the Intercounty Baseball League for the 2022 season.

References

External links

1990 births
Living people
Algodoneros de Unión Laguna players
Dominican Republic expatriate baseball players in Canada
Dominican Republic expatriate baseball players in Japan
Dominican Republic expatriate baseball players in Mexico
Dominican Republic expatriate baseball players in the United States
Dominican Summer League Rangers players
Dominican Summer League Padres players
El Paso Chihuahuas players
Fort Wayne TinCaps players
Lake Elsinore Storm players
Major League Baseball pitchers
Major League Baseball players from the Dominican Republic
Nippon Professional Baseball pitchers
People from San Cristóbal Province
Piratas de Campeche players
Saitama Seibu Lions players
San Antonio Missions players
San Diego Padres players
Tigres de Aragua players
Tigres del Licey players
Toros del Este players
Dominican Republic expatriate baseball players in Venezuela